Tobi 10 - Coptic Calendar - Tobi 12

The eleventh day of the Coptic month of Tobi, the fifth month of the Coptic year. On a common year, this day corresponds to January 6, of the Julian Calendar, and January 19, of the Gregorian Calendar. This day marks the start of the Coptic Season of Shemu, the season of the Harvest, during which the crops mature and become ready to harvest. To mark the change of season, the "Litany of the Plants" is replaced by the "Litany for the Air of Heaven and the Fruits" in liturgical services. On this day, the Coptic Church celebrates the Feast of the Theophany.

Commemorations

Feasts 

 The of the Theophany of Jesus Christ

Saints 

 The departure of Pope John VI, the 74th Patriarch of the See of Saint Mark 
 The departure of Pope Benjamin II, the 82nd Patriarch of the See of Saint Mark

Other commemorations 

 The start of the Coptic Season of Shemu, the season of the Harvest

References 

Days of the Coptic calendar